James Paul Szymanski (born September 7, 1967) is a former American football defensive end. He played for the Denver Broncos from 1990 to 1991.placed on IR in 1993 for the Pittsburgh Steelers.

References

1967 births
Living people
American football defensive ends
Michigan State Spartans football players
Denver Broncos players